Kameda may refer to:

People
 Kameda (surname)

Places
 Kameda District, Hokkaidō
 Kameda, Niigata
 Ugo-Kameda Station, Akita Prefecture

Businesses
 Kameda Seika Company Limited of Niigata, Japan, a manufacturer of rice cookies and crackers